Kaha may refer to:

Places
 Kaha, Iran, a village in Hormozgan Province, Iran
 Kaha, Kalbajar, a village in the Kalbajar District, Azerbaijan
 Kaha, Lachin, a village in the Lachin District, Azerbaijan
 Kaha, Parang, a barangay in Parang, Sulu, Philippines
 Te Kaha, a town in New Zealand
 Kaha-ri, a district of Usi province, North Korea
 Qaha, a city in Egypt, often spelt Kaha

Other
 Kaha (Māori), a Māori term roughly translating as strength
 Kia kaha, a Māori term of affirmation or support
 Daniel Kaha (born 1989), Israeli footballer
 HMNZS Te Kaha (F77), a New Zealand naval frigate
 Ka-Ha, a type of Chinese armoured vehicle
 KAHA- a Hawaiian radio station now broadcasting as KPOI-FM
Kaha is also a Sanskrit term meaning "to speak"
 Kaha Pte - Singapore wearable technology company